Fallen is the sixteenth release and the eleventh studio album by the Christian metal band Stryper, produced by the frontman Michael Sweet and released on October 16, 2015.

Background
Fallen is an album featuring the band's signature sounds and style on mostly original songs and one cover song, unlike several of their previous albums which covered their own songs (2013's Second Coming) and covers of others' works (2011's The Covering). However, the sound of the album is heavier, but still retains the band's melodic pattern. Five singles from the album have been released per month, "Yahweh", "Fallen", "Big Screen Lies", "Let There Be Light", and Stryper's second Black Sabbath cover, "After Forever".

Critical reception

Awarding the album four stars from HM magazine, Charlie Steffens wrote, "another wonderful album from some of rock and roll's best songwriters." Andy Argyrakis, giving the album four stars at CCM magazine, said, "Arguably the most game-changing Christian rock band in history, Stryper continues to excel with a steady stream of new music that fits right alongside a ten million-album selling catalogue." Rating the album a four out of five by The Phantom Tollbooth, Bert Saraco said, "Stryper marches on with Fallen – exactly what you want to hear from the iconic pop-metal band with a few surprises on the side". Derek Walker, in a four out of five review for The Phantom Tollbooth, responded, "It may not quite reach the heights of the previous release, but Fallen shows great ambition for a band this far into its career." In a four star review at Jesus Freak Hideout, Bert Gangl described, "the presence of the last few songs does ultimately render Fallen marginally less impressive than No More Hell to Pay."

Commercial performance 
The album sold over 10,000 copies in its first weeks, which is 400 more copies than No More Hell to Pay in 2013.

Track listing

Personnel 
 Michael Sweet - lead vocals, guitar
 Robert Sweet - drums, percussion
 Oz Fox - lead guitar, vocals
 Tim Gaines - bass guitar, vocals

Additional personnel 
 Paul McNamara - additional keyboards, synthesizer and Moog
 Laura Manzi - additional vocals on chorus of "Yahweh"

Chart performance

References

Stryper albums